Bjørnar Johannessen (born 23 September 1977) is a retired Norwegian football midfielder who manages Kråkerøy IL.

He started his career in Vesterøy, and went on to Lisleby, Råde and Eik-Tønsberg. He then joined Fredrikstad FK, and helped win promotion to the Norwegian Premier League. He got eighteen Premier League games in 2004 without scoring. Ahead of the 2005 season he joined Sparta Sarpsborg, and ahead of the 2008 season he joined Moss FK. He joined Sarpsborg 08 in the middle of the 2009-season, and decided to retire at the end of the season. Johannessen became player-coach at Kråkerøy IL in 2010.

References

1977 births
Living people
People from Østfold
Norwegian footballers
Eik-Tønsberg players
Fredrikstad FK players
Sarpsborg 08 FF players
Moss FK players
Eliteserien players
Norwegian First Division players
Association football midfielders
Sportspeople from Viken (county)